Syritta nigrifemorata is a species of syrphid fly in the family Syrphidae.

Distribution
Congo, South Africa, Madagascar.

References

Eristalinae
Diptera of Africa
Taxa named by Pierre-Justin-Marie Macquart
Insects described in 1842